Huachen Automotive Group Holdings Co. Ltd., known for its brand name Brilliance Auto Group, was a Chinese multinational automobile manufacturer holding company headquartered in Shenyang. Its products include automobiles, microvans, and automotive components. Its principal activity is the design, development, manufacture and sale of passenger cars sold under the Brilliance brand.

Brilliance Auto Group holds a 42.32% shareholding in the Bermuda-incorporated Brilliance China Automotive Holdings Limited (commonly known as Brilliance Auto or Brilliance China), which is listed on the Frankfurt and Hong Kong stock exchanges.

Brilliance China Automotive Holdings (Brilliance Auto) previously produced "Brilliance" branded cars under manufacturing unit Brilliance Motor which has since been sold to BMW. Brilliance Auto also holds 25% of BMW Brilliance, a joint venture with BMW which produces, distributes and sells BMW passenger cars in mainland China. It also holds a 51% stake of Renault Brilliance Jinbei, a joint venture with Renault which designs, develops, manufactures and sells light commercial vehicles under the Jinbei, Huasong and Renault brands. As of 2022, BMW holds 100% share in Brilliance Motor and 75% of BMW-Brilliance, controlling the majority of production capacity under Brilliance.

In 2010, Brilliance Auto Group and its subsidiaries had an annual production capacity of 800,000 vehicles although capacity has come online since. In 2012, the company manufactured almost 650,000 vehicles, the eighth-largest production of any Chinese vehicle maker that year. Roughly 70% of production was consumer sedans.

History

Origins 
The origins of Brilliance Auto Group (officially Huachen Automotive Group Holdings Company Limited) can be traced to a Chinese government-owned automobile factory which under founding chairman Yang Rong, became one of the leading Chinese makers of minibuses between 1991 and 2002.

1990s 
On 9, June 1992, a subsidiary, Brilliance China Automotive Holding Limited was incorporated in Bermuda. In the same year, the company was registered as a foreign company in the Hong Kong Companies Registry. Initially, the subsidiary owned 40% stake of Shenyang Jinbei Coach Manufacturing Co. Ltd., while the rest of the stake was owned by another company, Shenyang Jinbei Automotive Company Limited. The ratio was later changed to 51% owned by Brilliance China Auto and 49% owned by Shenyang Jinbei Automotive. The American depositary shares of Brilliance China Auto was floated in New York Stock Exchange from 1992 as NYSE:CBA. The company intended to delist from NYSE in 2007  and completed in 2009.

In 1999, the Group injected most part of the group assets to the subsidiary, and the shares started to float in the Stock Exchange of Hong Kong (now part of Hong Kong Exchanges and Clearing) as SEHK:1114. , Huachen Automotive Group (Brilliance Auto Group) owned 42.32% shares of the listed company as the largest and controlling shareholder.

The Group has another listed associate company that is listing in the Shanghai Stock Exchange: Shenyang Jinbei Automotive Company Limited. , the Brilliance Auto Group, via an intermediate company Shenyang Automobile Industry Asset Management Company Limited, owned 24.38% shares of that company as the largest and controlling shareholder. It was planned to inject the stake into the major listed company of the group, Brilliance Auto, in 2003. However, the deal was collapsed. Nevertheless, Shenyang Jinbei Automotive did not have the controlling interest on Shenyang Jinbei Coach Manufacturing since 1992, which is the predecessor of Brilliance Jinbei (now Renault Brilliance Jinbei).

Shenyang Jinbei Automotive was listed in the stock exchange since 1992. Shenyang Jinbei Automotive and Brilliance Auto Group were separate conglomerates, which the controlling stake of Shenyang Jinbei Automotive was acquired by FAW Group in 1995. Shenyang Automobile Industry AMC agreed to acquire 29.91% stake from FAW Group in 2000.

2000s 
In 2001, Shenhua Holdings agreed to acquire the shares of Shenyang Jinbei Automotive that held by Shenyang Automobile Industry AMC, allowing the Jinbei marque integrated into the Group. However, the deal revised into Brilliance Auto agreed to acquire the stake from Shenyang Automobile Industry AMC in 2003. Despite the final deal became Brilliance Auto Group acquired Shenyang Automobile Industry AMC directly in April 2018 from the Shenyang Municipal People's Government, which in turn has the full control on the stake of Shenyang Jinbei Automotive that held by the AMC.

In 2003, BMW and Brilliance Auto signed a deal for the production of BMW-branded sedans in China.

In 2005, Brilliance planned an entry into the newly formed FIA World Touring Car Championship. However, the Brilliance WTCC program did not make the grid.

From 2009 to 2011, the group was between the eighth-largest automaker in China.

2010s to present
In 2012, Brilliance Auto Group formed a joint venture Brilliance Shineray in Chongqing with Shineray Group to produce SWM and Jinbei brand automobiles. As of 2019, Shineray Group owned 80% stake of that joint venture. The latter is not part of the Brilliance Auto Group, but the Group provides guarantee to some debt of that company.

In 2013, Brilliance Auto formed a spin-off, Xinchen China Power Holdings Limited.

In 2017, Brilliance Auto also formed another joint venture Renault Brilliance Jinbei with Renault. The Brilliance Auto acquired the remaining 39.1% stake of Brilliance Jinbei from sister company Shenyang Jinbei Automotive, and then Brilliance Auto re-sold 49% stake to Renault.

In October 2018, BMW Brilliance, a 50:50 joint venture between BMW and Brilliance, was taken over by BMW by acquiring an additional 25% of available shares.

In November 2020, Brilliance Auto Group went into bankruptcy administration, and announced the default of corporate bonds worth more than CNY6.5 billion. The bankruptcy administration is not affecting subsidiaries Brilliance Auto, Xinchen China Power, Shenhua Holdings, Shenyang Jinbei Automotive, or any of the joint ventures operated by the organization.

Products
Brilliance Auto Group and its subsidiaries sell passenger cars under the Brilliance marque

Brilliance products (produced under Brilliance Motor)

Latest products

Brilliance H220 / H230
Brilliance H320 / H330
Brilliance H3
Brilliance V3
Brilliance V6
Brilliance V7

Earlier discontinued models
Brilliance Tun (Dolphin)
Brilliance BS2
Brilliance FRV
Brilliance FRV Cross
Brilliance FSV
Brilliance H530
Brilliance M1 (Zunchi)
Brilliance M2 (Junjie)
Brilliance M3 (Kubao)
Brilliance V5

Huasong 

 Huasong 7

Joint ventures and alliances

BMW Brilliance

In 2003, BMW and Brilliance agreed to make select products of this German luxury carmaker in China. As of 2010, the joint venture makes the BMW 3 Series and BMW 5 Series and had plans to introduce the BMW X1 by 2012. As of 2011, locally produced engines were slated to appear in some offerings soon, and the company had plans to bring up total production capacity to 300,000 by 2013.

These vehicles may differ slightly from those sold in other markets under the same names. As of mid-2010 almost 60% of the components used to manufacture the China-built BMWs were imported to China.

Brilliance Shineray

Brilliance Shineray is a joint venture between Brilliance Auto Group and Shineray Motorcycle Company (Shineray Group), one of China's largest motorcycle producers. Shineray Group bought the Italian motorcycle brand, SWM (motorcycles), and started an automotive brand with the SWM nameplate. SWM now makes a range of crossovers and compact MPVs.

Key models include:

SWM G01
SWM X7
SWM X3

Renault Brilliance Jinbei (Jinbei) 

Formerly a wholly-owned subsidiary (Shenyang Brilliance Jinbei Automotive) which sold licensed Toyota and General Motors designs, Jinbei was re-formed with Renault in 2017 with plans to launch light commercial vehicles and SUVs with Renault technology, under the Jinbei and Renault marques.

Key models include:

 Jinbei Konect (Guanjing)
 Jinbei New Haise
 Jinbei F50
 Jinbei S70
 Jinbei Haishiwang

Operations
BMW-branded autos are made at a production base in the Northeastern Chinese city of Shenyang completed in 2004, and ongoing construction saw this base increase its production capacity to 200,000 units/year by 2012.

An engine-making production base is located in Mianyang, Sichuan province.

Sales 
A total of 188,143 Brilliance marque vehicles were sold in China in 2013, making it the 25th largest-selling car brand in the country in that year (and the tenth largest-selling Chinese brand).

European exports
In 2007, Brilliance's BS6 sedan performed poorly in a crash test conducted by Germany's ADAC, receiving only one out of five possible stars in the Euro NCAP rating. Brilliance then redesigned the car, changing at least sixty components, and it saw a three-star performance in a crash test performed by Spain's Idiada. However, the price also rose considerably, and the importer (HSO Motors) went bankrupt in November 2009. Brilliance then tried to go it alone, but with high pricing and considerable market reluctance after the well-publicized crash test failures, exports to Europe were ended in April 2010 with no immediate plans for resumption.

SAIPA
In 2015, Brilliance announced it had started joint production with SAIPA of Iran, to produce the H300 and H200 models, under the local brand name of Saipa.

References

External links

 

 
Car brands
Companies listed on the Hong Kong Stock Exchange
Car manufacturers of China
Chinese brands
Luxury motor vehicle manufacturers
Vehicle manufacturing companies established in 1992
Multinational companies headquartered in China
Companies that have filed for bankruptcy in the People's Republic of China
Defunct motor vehicle manufacturers of China